Dewi Lake is a Welsh rugby union player currently playing for United Rugby Championship side Ospreys and the Wales national side. Lake's position is Hooker. Lake made his international debut against Ireland in the 2022 Six Nations Championship.

Club career
Having appeared for Bridgend Ravens and Neath RFC at youth level, Lake joined the Ospreys academy as a back row. Shortly after his arrival, Lake was converted to hooker.

Lake made his Ospreys debut in 2018 against Zebre. Lake scored his first Ospreys try in the Round 6 meeting with Munster on 15 November 2020, before scoring his second try against Benetton the following week.

On 1 March 2021, Lake signed a new two year deal to remain with the Ospreys.

On 20 January 2023, Lake scored the Ospreys first try against Leicester Tigers as they secured their place in the knockout rounds of the 2022–23 European Rugby Champions Cup. He suffered a knee injury during the match, which ruled him out of the 2023 Six Nations Championship.

International
Capped at Wales under-20 level for the first time in 2018, Lake was selected to captain the side at the 2019 World Rugby Championship. During the tournament Lake captained Wales to an 8-7 victory over New Zealand, only the second under-20 victory over the age grade All Blacks.

Lake received his first call to the senior Wales squad for the 2020 Six Nations, although he would not make any appearances at the tournament. Lake would next be called up ahead of the 2022 Six Nations. Lake made his senior debut in the opening test against Ireland, appearing as a replacement in the second half. Lake would appear in all 5 games of the tournament, including a start in the final game, a defeat to Italy at the Principality Stadium. During the match, Lake scored his first test try.

Lake featured off the bench in all three of the tests during the 2022 Wales rugby union tour of South Africa, scoring a try in the first match, and contributing to the historic win in the second test.

A shoulder injury ruled Lake out of the 2022 end-of-year rugby union internationals, while he missed the 2023 Six Nations with a knee injury.

International tries

References

External links

Ospreys Player Profile

Welsh rugby union players
Rugby union hookers
Rugby union players from Bridgend
Ospreys (rugby union) players
Living people
1999 births
Wales international rugby union players